The Mallock Mk.XI, also designated as the Mallock Mk.11, is an open-wheel formula racing car, developed and built by Ray Mallock Ltd., in 1970. It was specifically designed and constructed to compete in the Clubman category and class; which catered to front-engined sports prototype race cars. It was also later used in Formula Three racing.

References

Formula Three cars
Sports prototypes
Open wheel racing cars